TanSat, also known as CarbonSat, is a Chinese Earth observation satellite dedicated to monitoring carbon dioxide in Earth's atmosphere. It is generally classified as a minisatellite, and is the first dedicated carbon mission of the Chinese space program. The mission was formally proposed in 2010, and work began in January 2011. It is funded by the Ministry of Science and Technology (MOST) and was built by the Shanghai Institute of Microsystem And Information Technology (SIMIT).

TanSat carries two instruments: the Carbon Dioxide Spectrometer and the Cloud and Aerosol Polarimetry Imager. The Carbon Dioxide Spectrometer (CDS), also called CarbonSpec, is a high-resolution grating spectrometer which measures  absorption at 1.61 μm and 2.06 μm, and  absorption in reflected sunlight at 0.76 μm. The Cloud and Aerosol Polarimetry Imager (CAPI) is a wide-field, moderate-resolution, imaging spectrometer which works in concert with CDS by compensating for measurement errors caused by clouds and aerosols. It makes observations in ultraviolet (0.38 μm), visible (0.67 μm), and near infrared (0.87 μm, 1.375 μm, and 1.64 μm).

See also 

Greenhouse Gases Observing Satellite
Orbiting Carbon Observatory 2
Space-based measurements of carbon dioxide

References

Spacecraft launched in 2016
Spacecraft launched by Long March rockets
Carbon dioxide
2016 in China
Earth observation satellites of China